Martha A. Zeiger is an American endocrine surgeon and scientist. She is an adjunct investigator in the Surgical Oncology Program  at the National Institutes of Health, where she previously served as director. She was the S. Hurt Watts Professor and Chair of the Department of Surgery at the University of Virginia. Prior to joining academia, Zeiger spent six years in the United States Navy as General Medical Officer, Commander and Surgeon in San Diego, Hawaii and Washington, D.C.

Early life and education
Zeiger was born to a war veteran father who served in World War II as an engineer on the USS Indianapolis. She enrolled at Brown University for her undergraduate degree and the  Robert Larner College of Medicine at the University of Vermont for her medical degree before entering the United States Navy. Her surgical training included a surgery residency at Maine Medical Center and a surgical oncology fellowship at the National Cancer Institutes, NIH. She spent six years with the navy as a General Medical Officer, Commander and Surgeon in San Diego, Hawaii and Washington, D.C before joining academia.

Career
In 1993, Zeiger joined the faculty at Johns Hopkins School of Medicine (JHU) where she established an endocrine surgery practice, endocrine surgery fellowship, and directed a molecular biology laboratory. There she rose to Chief of Endocrine Surgery and Associate Dean for Postdoctoral Fellows. She eventually left JHU in 2017 to become the S. Hurt Watts Professor and Chair of the Department of Surgery at the University of Virginia. In 2019, Zeiger was the recipient of the Braverman Distinguished Award from the American Thyroid Association (ATA) as someone who has "demonstrated excellence and passion for mentoring fellows, students, and junior faculty; has a long history of productive thyroid research; and is devoted to the ATA." During the same year, Zeiger began a one-year term as president of ATA's board of directors.

Personal life
Zeiger is married to John Britton, a pediatric anesthesiologist, and they have two children together, Tenaya and Zachary Britton.

References

Living people
Year of birth missing (living people)
Brown University alumni
University of Vermont alumni
University of Virginia faculty
Johns Hopkins University faculty
American women physicians
20th-century American naval officers
20th-century American women
American women academics